John Carron (1909–1998) was a nationalist politician in Northern Ireland.

Carron was born in Kinawley, County Fermanagh in 1909. He became a farmer and a publican before becoming a founder member and Vice-Chairman of the Irish Anti-Partition League in Lisnaskea in May 1946. He was elected to Lisnaskea Rural District Council and also became the Chairman of the Enniskillen Fisheries Board.

At the 1949 Northern Ireland general election, Carron unsuccessfully stood for the Nationalist Party in Lisnaskea. He next stood for South Fermanagh in 1965, this time successfully, holding the seat until the abolition of the Parliament of Northern Ireland at Stormont in 1972. In 1969, he was appointed Opposition Spokesman on Community Relations. He was invited to join the Social Democratic and Labour Party on its formation, but chose to remain a Nationalist Party member.

Frank Maguire, Member of Parliament for Fermanagh and South Tyrone, was a nephew of John Carron and, as a young man, worked in his uncle's pub. Sinn Féin activist Owen Carron, who was also an MP for Fermanagh and South Tyrone, was no relation of Carron's.

References

1909 births
1998 deaths
Date of birth missing
Date of death missing
Councillors in County Fermanagh
Members of the House of Commons of Northern Ireland 1965–1969
Members of the House of Commons of Northern Ireland 1969–1973
Nationalist Party (Ireland) members of the House of Commons of Northern Ireland
Politicians from County Fermanagh
Members of the House of Commons of Northern Ireland for County Fermanagh constituencies